Bouy or variant, may refer to:

Places
 Bouy, Marne, France; a commune
 Bouy-sur-Orvin (Bouy-upon-Orvin), Aube, France; a commune
 Bouy (town), Kostroma Oblast, Russia

People
 Gaston Bouy (1866-1943) French artist
 Ouasim Bouy (born 1993) Dutch soccer player
 André Bouys (1656-1740) French artist

Other uses
 "bouy" is a common misspelling in English, see commonly misspelled English words

See also

Soisy-Bouy, Seine-et-Marne, France; a commune
Bouy-Luxembourg, Aube, France; a commune
Berry-Bouy, Cher, France; a commune
Boy (disambiguation)
Buy (disambiguation)
Buoy (disambiguation)
Buoy